Parliamentary elections were held in Bosnia and Herzegovina on 11 November 2000. Voter turnout was 64%.

The elections for the House of Representatives were divided into two; one for the Federation of Bosnia and Herzegovina and one for Republika Srpska. The Social Democratic Party emerged as the largest party in the House of Representatives, winning 9 of the 42 seats.

Electoral system
The elections for the House of Representatives were divided into two; one for the Federation of Bosnia and Herzegovina and one for Republika Srpska. The 42 members of the House of Representatives are elected by proportional representation in two constituencies, the Federation of Bosnia and Herzegovina and Republika Srpska. The House of Peoples (the upper house of the parliament) has 15 members equally distributed among the three ethnic groups in Bosnia and Herzegovina: 5 Bosniaks, 5 Serbs, and 5 Croats. The members are appointed by the parliaments of the constituent peoples.

Results
The Social Democratic Party (SDP BiH) of Zlatko Lagumdžija emerged as the largest party, with 9 of the 42 seats in the House of Representatives, while the conservative Party of Democratic Action (SDA) finished second with 8 seats in the House of Representatives. Voter turnout was 64.0%.

By entity

References

Parliamentary
Elections in Bosnia and Herzegovina
Bosnia
Bosnia